The National Disabled Women's Educational Equity Project was established by Corbett O'Toole in Berkeley, California, in 1980. It was a three-year research and demonstration project. Based at the Disability Rights Education and Defense Fund (DREDF), the Project administered the first national survey on disability and gender. It also conducted the first national Conference on Disabled Women's Educational Equity, which was held in Bethesda, Maryland. It developed written materials for educators and counselors relevant to the needs of disabled women and girls. It also developed a book about role models for disabled teenage girls called No More Stares.

References

Disability organizations based in the United States